Route 480 or Highway 480 may refer to:

Canada
Manitoba Provincial Road 480
New Brunswick Route 480
 Newfoundland and Labrador Route 480

Ireland
 R480 regional road

Japan
 Japan National Route 480

United States
  Interstate 480
  Interstate 480N (unsigned)
  California State Route 480 (former)
  Maryland Route 480
  Puerto Rico Highway 480
  West Virginia Route 480